Joseph Hodges may refer to:

Joseph Howard Hodges (1911–1985), American Catholic prelate
Joseph Lawson Hodges Jr. (1922–2000), statistician
Joseph Jehoida Hodges (1876–1930), Welsh rugby union player
Sir Joseph Hodges, 2nd Baronet (c. 1704–1722) of the Hodges baronets